Sir Philippe Samyn (born 1 September 1948, in Ghent) is a Belgian architect and civil engineer whose style is characterized by extensive use of glass, wood and steel to build often monumental structures. He is also known for his discovery of "The volume and displacement indicators for an architectural structure" in August 1997.

Biography 
Philippe Samyn started his education in Ghent, before moving to Brussels with his family. He was interested in art, architecture, sciences and technology from an early age.

He holds a degree in civil engineering from Brussels Free University (ULB) in 1971, a Master of Sciences in Civil Engineering from the Massachusetts Institute of Technology (MIT), in 1973, a degree in urban planning from the ULB (1973), a postgraduate in management from the Solvay Business School (1985). He became Doctor of Applied sciences at the University of Liège in 1999.

He begins his consultant activity as an architect and engineer in 1972 and founds Philippe Samyn and Partners in 1980. He advocates the concept of "efficiency": a rational use of materials' properties. His approach is therefore opposed to those producing structures that are expensive, fragile or use excess material. His technical research was thus awarded a Global Award for Sustainable Architecture in 2008.

His archives are regularly transferred and available for consultation:
 Hand-written, graphic and iconographic documents and models are at the National Royal Archives of Belgium.
 Pictures and original films are at the Royal Academy of Sciences, Letters and Arts of Belgium.

Philippe Samyn is Commander of the Order of Léopold and a member of the Royal Academy of Sciences, Letters and Fine Arts of Belgium. He is personally ennobled with the grant of hereditary nobility to Knighthood by HM King Albert II of Belgium on 13 July 2012. His motto is "Reperire, Invenire, Creare".

Philippe Samyn and Partners

Description 
Philippe Samyn and Partners is a partnership of architects and engineers founded in 1980 which currently employs about fifty associates.
The team carries out integrated projects, from landscape design to furniture, including engineering.
It is based in the neighborhood of the Prince of Orange, south of Brussels.
The partnership is certified ISO 9001 – 2015, ISO 14001 – 2015 and VALIDEO. Partners are Philippe Samyn (statutory manager), Denis Mélott and Johan Van Rompaey (engineer architects), Antonio Quinones (secretary-general) and Ghislain André, Jacques Ceyssens, Quentin Steyaert, André Charon, Åsa Decorte (architects).

Major projects 
1993 – Psychiatric Clinic "Sans Souci", Brussels, Belgium
2001 – UCLouvain Aula Magna, Louvain-la-Neuve, Belgium
2008 – "Vesuvio-Est" railway station, Striano, Italy
2009 – Studio for the painter Erik Salvesen, Ekenäs, Finland
2009 – Faculty of Applied Science, Université libre de Bruxelles, Brussels, Belgium
2010 – Lujiazhi cultural creativity garden, reception hall, large auditorium and hotel, Zhoushan, China
2014 – Social housing at rue de l'Olivier, Schaerbeek, Belgium
2015 – European Space Agency of Redu, Belgium
2015 – Namur Province House of Culture, Namur, Belgium
2017 – Namur Province Administration House, Namur, Belgium
2017 – "M'as-tu vu" square, Knokke-Heist, Belgium
2017 – Arctic Circle theater, Rovaniemi, Finland
2017 – Europa Building (Council of the European Union and European Council), Brussels, Belgium
2018 – Steel tent for a multipurpose public space in Avilés, Spain
2018 – Cash Centre, National Bank of Belgium, Brussels, Belgium

See also 

 Aula Magna (UCLouvain)
 Europa building
 University of Liège

References

External links
 Official website of Philippe Samyn and Partners

Living people
Belgian civil engineers
1948 births
Architects from Ghent
20th-century Belgian engineers
21st-century Belgian engineers
Université libre de Bruxelles alumni
MIT School of Engineering alumni
University of Liège alumni
Engineers from Ghent